Gordonstone may refer to:

 Gordonstone, Queensland, a locality in the Central Highlands Region, Australia
 a misspelling of Gordonstoun, a school in Scotland